Swallow is Zhao Wei's first album. The title sourced Zhao's first acclaimed role - Xiaoyanzi (小燕子; "Swallow") in My Fair Princess. In its first day of release, this album sold out 100,000 copies in Taiwan.

Track listing
You Yi Ge Gu Niang (There's a Girl)
Bo Lang Gu (Wave Drum)
Sha La La
Bu Neng He Ni Fen Shou (Can't Break up With You)
Saturday Night
Zhen Xin Bu Jia (True Heart)
Chi Lun (Gear)
Zi Cong You Le Ni (Ever Since I had You)
Ping Zhong Xing 瓶中信(Message in a Bottle)
Yu Zhong De Gu Shi (Rain Season's Story)
Pump Wave Drum 搏浪鼓 [Kala]
Can't Break Up With You 不能和你分手 [Kala](Instrumental)
Tracks 1, 8 and 12 were from My Fair Princess

Awards and nominations
Radio Hong Kong Station Awards
 Won: Favorite New Artist
 Won: Favorite Artist-Bronze Prize

Metro Radio Station Awards
 Won: Favorite Artist

China Pop Music Chart Committee Special Awards
 Won: Best Potential Artist

References

External links
Zhao Wei Net Family-Swallow

1999 albums
Zhao Wei albums